Brezje pri Kumpolju is a small remote settlement in the Municipality of Litija in central Slovenia. The area is part of the traditional region of Lower Carniola. It is now included with the rest of the municipality in the Central Sava Statistical Region; until January 2014 the municipality was part of the Central Slovenia Statistical Region.

Name
Brezje pri Kumpolju was attested in written sources as Pierkg in 1436 and Pirgkhach in 1498, among other spellings. The name of the settlement was changed from Brezje to Brezje pri Kumpolju in 1953.

References

External links
Brezje pri Kumpolju on Geopedia

Populated places in the Municipality of Litija